Jade is the third album of Sweetbox and the second with Jade Villalon as a frontwoman. It was released in 2002 in Japan and Europe, 2003 in Taiwan, and 2004 in Korea. Although similar to Classified, the album saw new influences emerging, and showcased a number of tracks, such as "Lighter Shade of Blue", that had not sampled famous classical pieces.

A year later, a Silver edition was released with acoustic versions of some of the songs, including remixes and the re-vamped, re-done version of "Lighter Shade of Blue" that was featured on the "Here on My Own" music video, and a bonus DVD with three music videos.

Track listing

Credits
Standard Edition
 Backing Vocals - Denise, Mucky
 Executive Producer – Heiko Schmidt
 Vocals - Jade Villalon
 Mixed By - Geoman
Silver Edition
 Guitar - Geo
 Guitar, Mandolin - Holger Düchting
 Guitar (Bass) - Oliver Poschmann
 Guitars, Backing Vocals - Toby Breitenbach
 Percussion - Tilman Bruno
 Producer - Geoman
 Backing Vocals - Denise
 Written By - Geoman, Villalon

Samples
 "Human Sacrifice" samples 'Pavane (Fauré)' from Gabriel Fauré 
 "Don't Push Me" samples 'Moonlight Sonata' from Beethoven
 "Read My Mind" samples 'Cavalleria Rusticana' from Pietro Mascagni
 "Sacred" samples 'Boléro' from Maurice Ravel

Certifications

References

2002 albums
Sweetbox albums